Çatakbağ  is a village in Mut district of Mersin Province, Turkey. The village is situated in the Taurus Mountains. The population of the village was 198 as of 2012.

References

Villages in Mut District